Jérôme Coppel (born 6 August 1986) is a French former road bicycle racer, who rode professionally between 2008 and 2016 for the , ,  and  teams.

Career
Born in Annemasse, Haute-Savoie, Coppel and compatriot Romain Sicard were the focus of a four-page spread in the sports magazine L'Équipe, with the headline Bientôt un crack française? ("Soon a French champ?"). His presence helped  gain its invitation to the 2011 Tour de France, where he finished 14th in the general classification and third in the young rider classification.

Coppel left  at the end of the 2012 season, and joined  for the 2013 season. In December 2014 he was announced as part of the squad for the  team for 2015.

Coppel retired after the 2016 Tour de l'Ain.

Major results
Source: 

2004
 1st  Time trial, National Junior Road Championships
 10th Time trial, UCI Junior Road World Championships
2005
 2nd Time trial, National Under-23 Road Championships
2006
 1st  Time trial, National Under-23 Road Championships
 1st Stage 3 Tour des Pays de Savoie
 2nd  Time trial, UEC European Under-23 Road Championships
 3rd  Time trial, UCI Under-23 Road World Championships
 4th Overall Tour de Berlin
2007
 National Under-23 Road Championships
1st  Time trial
1st  Road race
 1st  Overall Circuit des Ardennes
1st  Young rider classification
 3rd  Time trial, UCI Under-23 Road World Championships
 3rd Overall Grand Prix Guillaume Tell
 5th Time trial, UEC European Under-23 Road Championships
 5th Time trial, National Road Championships
 7th Overall Thüringen Rundfahrt der U23
2008
 4th Overall Tour de l'Avenir
 6th Overall Tour de l'Ain
 8th Tour du Finistère
2009
 1st Route Adélie
 4th Overall La Tropicale Amissa Bongo
 5th Time trial, National Road Championships
 6th Overall Critérium International
2010
 1st  Overall Tour du Gévaudan Languedoc-Roussillon
1st Stage 2
 1st  Overall Rhône-Alpes Isère Tour
1st Stage 1
 1st Tour du Doubs
 3rd Gran Premio de Llodio
 4th Vuelta a La Rioja
 5th Overall Critérium du Dauphiné
 6th Overall Tour de l'Ain
 6th Tour du Finistère
 7th Giro dell'Emilia
 9th Overall Paris–Nice
 9th Les Boucles du Sud-Ardèche
 10th Gran Premio Bruno Beghelli
2011
 1st  Overall Vuelta a Murcia
1st Stage 3 (ITT)
 1st  Young rider classification Critérium du Dauphiné
 4th Overall Vuelta a Andalucía
 5th Overall Vuelta a Castilla y León
 5th Overall Étoile de Bessèges
 9th Overall Tour du Poitou-Charentes
2012
 1st  Overall Étoile de Bessèges
1st Stage 5b (ITT)
 1st Tour du Doubs
 2nd Overall Bayern–Rundfahrt
 3rd Overall Vuelta a Andalucía
 5th Overall Tour de l'Ain
 9th Overall Tour of Britain
2013
 4th Time trial, National Road Championships
2014
 2nd Overall Étoile de Bessèges
 5th Time trial, National Road Championships
 6th Overall Tour of Austria
  Combativity award Stage 20 Vuelta a España
2015
 1st  Time trial, National Road Championships
 3rd  Time trial, UCI Road World Championships
2016
 1st  Overall Étoile de Bessèges
1st Stage 5 (ITT)
 2nd Overall Circuit de la Sarthe
 4th Time trial, National Road Championships
 8th Classic Sud-Ardèche

Grand Tour general classification results timeline

References

External links 

Palmarès on cyclingbase.com
 

1986 births
Living people
People from Annemasse
French male cyclists
Université Savoie-Mont Blanc alumni
Sportspeople from Haute-Savoie
Cyclists from Auvergne-Rhône-Alpes